The Love River or Ai River is a river (canal) in southern Taiwan. It originates in Renwu District, Kaohsiung City, and flows  through Kaohsiung to Kaohsiung Harbor. Love River is the spine of Kaohsiung, playing a similar role to the River Thames of London. It is of great cultural significance to the people of Kaohsiung and plays an important role in its economy and tourism.  A riverside park, the Love River Park, runs along the riverbank in downtown Kaohsiung City. A night market operates in the park, and there are three outdoor cafés, often with live bands. Boats which hold about fifteen people take tourists up and down the river. The scenery is enhanced by attractive city structures near the river, such as the Holy Rosary Cathedral, Kaohsiung Bridge, and the Kaohsiung District Court. Cultural events such as concerts and the Lantern Festival are often held by the river.

The Love River was once heavily polluted, when raw sewage and industrial waste water flowed untreated into the river. Recent efforts by the city government to divert the waste water to the treatment plant in Cijin District has resulted in significantly improved water quality. Love River is now used for sightseeing, and there are duck boats, love boats and gondola rides for tourists to enjoy the city view. In 2018, mayor Han Kuo-yu proposed that a ferris wheel be built on the bank of Love River to create a romance industry and improve the economy.

History
Before the urban development of the area, the river flowed in a wide and flat channel, used for irrigation and surrounded by farms. During the Qing dynasty, it was called the Takao River. In 1895, the Japanese dredged the river and turned it into a canal to transport lumber from Southeast Asia. Embankments (levees) were built on the river and in 1908, Kaohsiung Harbor was constructed at the mouth of the Love River, replacing the mangrove forests. In 1945, Taiwan fell under the control of the Republic of China and the riversides became parks. However, as Taiwan's economy switched from agricultural to industrial, the river began to get increasingly polluted. (The first incident of pollution was halfway through the Japanese occupation of Taiwan when paper mills ejected waste into the river.) The urbanization created more waste, and in 1965, raw sewage began to flow into the river when an export processing zone was created.

Name
It was originally called Takao River, from the Makato language of the Pingpu tribe, and later the Kaohsiung River. In the late 1940s, the name Love River came into popular usage after a pair of lovers died by suicide in its depths. Also, it's the time after the KMT took over Taiwan, tourists began to gather around a newly built riverside park. Boat companies start running a business of rowing and cruising. One of them is named Love River Cruise. However, a typhoon blew off the signboard of the shop, with only the first two characters "Love River" left on it. Nowadays it has become the official name of the river.

Love River was designated the official name in 1972. Previously, in 1968, the Kaohsiung mayor, Yang Chin-hu, had unsuccessfully tried to put forward an alternative of Jen Ai River – to commemorate the birthday of Chiang Kai-Shek.

Treatment
In 1979, the government started to clean the river. The water was black and had a sewer-like odor. A set of floodgates were built on the river to capture trash and sewage and send it to a treatment plant. Unfortunately, the system only works from October to April because in the rainy season, May to September, the treatment system cannot cope with the increased flow and the floodgates must be opened, sending pollution into the lower stretch of the Love River. (The river here is tidal and so is safe to swim in the dry season.)

Tributaries
Ta Kang Creek
Houbi Channel

Festivals and Events

Lantern Festival 
In 2008, the Kaohsiung Lantern Festival was held along the Love River. Since then, the Kaohsiung Lantern Festival becomes the most popular tourist attraction in Kaohsiung City every year. The festival usually begins a few days before the Lantern Festival and crosses the Western Valentine's Day on February 14 and ends after the Lantern Festival. The festival includes water dance, fireworks and art installations of lights and lanterns.

Dragon Boat Festival 
Dragon Boat Festival is an important holiday and event in Taiwan. Many cities conduct dragon boat races and the Love River is the venue for Kaohsiung. In the 2009 World Games the dragon boat race has included in the competition.

Kaohsiung World Games 
In 2009, the World Games hosted by the Kaohsiung City Government and the Love River becomes the first dragon boat race venue.

2018 Kaohsiung mayor's inauguration ceremony 
On November 24, 2018, the Kuomintang mayoral candidate Han Kuo-yu was elected mayor of Kaohsiung. On December 25, 2018, an inauguration ceremony was held on the banks of Love River.

References

External links 

 Wilma Chou, Kaohsiung City's Love River brought back from the dead, Taiwan Journal, August 23, 2002

Rivers of Taiwan
Landforms of Kaohsiung
Tourist attractions in Kaohsiung